Rivas Peaks is a line of rock peaks in Antarctica that jut westward for 2 nautical miles (3.7 km) from the south part of Torbert Escarpment in the Neptune Range, Pensacola Mountains. They were mapped by the United States Geological Survey (USGS) from surveys and U.S. Navy air photos from 1956 to 1966. They were named by the Advisory Committee on Antarctic Names (US-ACAN) for Merced G. Rivas, a radioman at Ellsworth Station during the winter of 1958.
 

Mountains of Queen Elizabeth Land
Pensacola Mountains